The 2004 Champ Car Grand Prix of Cleveland was the fifth round of the 2004 Bridgestone Presents the Champ Car World Series Powered by Ford season, held on July 3, 2004 at Burke Lakefront Airport in Cleveland, Ohio.  Paul Tracy took the pole while Sébastien Bourdais won the race.

Qualifying results

Race

Caution flags

Notes

 New Race Record Sébastien Bourdais 1:48:16.056
 Average Speed 113.209 mph

Championship standings after the race

Drivers' Championship standings

 Note: Only the top five positions are included.

References

External links
 Full Weekend Times & Results
 Thursday Qualifying Results
 Friday Qualifying Results
 Race Box Score

Cleveland
U.S. Bank Champ Car Grand Prix
Grand Prix of Cleveland